The Hickory Rebels were a Class D minor league baseball team based in Hickory, North Carolina, that played from 1939–1940, 1940, 1945–1954, 1960. The Rebels were the predecessor of the current Hickory Crawdads in the South Atlantic League.

History
The Rebels  played in the Tar Heel League (1939–1940, 1953–1954), North Carolina State League (1942, 1945–1951) and Western Carolinas League (1952, 1960). They were affiliates of the New York Giants (1945–1949) and Chicago Cubs (1952–1954).  A former team of the same name had participated in the independent Carolina League between 1936 and 1938.

The ballpark

The Rebels played at Fairgrounds Park. Fairgrounds Park is now called Henkel-Alley Field and serves as home to American Legion baseball and the Catawba Valley Community College Red Hawks.

Notable alumni

 John Buzhardt (1954)

 Red Corriden (1949)

 Eddie Haas (1953)

 Mickey O'Neil (1949)

References

Baseball teams established in 1939
Professional baseball teams in North Carolina
Defunct Western Carolinas League teams
Defunct minor league baseball teams
New York Giants minor league affiliates
Chicago Cubs minor league affiliates
Sports clubs disestablished in 1960
1939 establishments in North Carolina
1960 disestablishments in North Carolina
Hickory, North Carolina
Defunct baseball teams in North Carolina
Baseball teams disestablished in 1960
Tar Heel League teams